Rusudan (c. 1194–1245), a member of the Bagrationi dynasty, ruled as Queen of Georgia in 1223–1245.

Life 
Daughter of Queen Tamar of Georgia by David Soslan, she succeeded her brother George IV on January 18, 1223. George’s untimely death marked the beginning of the end of the Georgian Golden Age. Rusudan was unable to preserve whatever was gained by her mother and brother. She was known as a beautiful woman devoted to pleasure, whose hand was sought by her Muslim neighbors. In Muslim sources, such as Ata-Malik Juvayni, Rusudan was known as Qiz-Malik, from the Turkish qiz, "maiden", and the Arabic malik, "king". 

In the autumn of 1225, Georgia was attacked by the Khwarazmshah  Jalal ad-Din Mingburnu, pursued by the Mongols. The Georgians suffered bitter defeat at the Battle of Garni, and the royal court with King Rusudan moved to Kutaisi, when the Georgian capital Tbilisi was besieged by the Khwarezmians. A year later Jelal ad-Din took Tbilisi on 9 March 1226. The citizens fought courageously and over 100,000 lost their lives when the city fell to the Khwarezmians. The defeated Georgians were ordered to change religion and become Muslims, but refused and almost the whole population of Tbilisi was massacred. In February 1227, the Georgians took advantage of Jelal ad-Din’s failures in Armenia, and retook Tbilisi, but soon were forced to abandon the city – which they themselves had set alight in their battle with the occupation forces. Rusudan made an alliance with the neighbouring Seljuk rulers of Rüm and Ahlat, but the Georgians were routed by the Khwarezmians at Battle of Bolnisi, before the allies could arrive (1228).

The Khwarezmians were superseded by the Mongols. They advanced into Georgia in 1235. Devastated and plundered by Jelal ad-Din’s incursions, Georgia surrendered without any serious resistance. By 1240 all the country was under the Mongol yoke. Forced to accept the sovereignty of the Mongol Khan in 1242, Rusudan had to pay an annual tribute of 50,000 gold pieces and support the Mongols with a Georgian army.

Fearing that her nephew David would aspire to the throne, Rusudan held him prisoner at the court of her son-in-law, the sultan Kaykhusraw II, and sent her son David to the Mongol court to get his official recognition as heir apparent. She died in 1245, still waiting for her son to return.

Family 
She married in 1224 to the Seljuk prince Ghias ad-Din, a grandson of Kilij Arslan II who converted to Christianity on his marriage. They were the parents of David VI of Georgia and a daughter named Tamar, who married her cousin, the sultan Kaykhusraw II, and following his death in 1246, the Pervane Mu'in al-Din Suleyman as one of the preconditions of the peace settlement.

See also

References 

 

Kings of Georgia
Queens regnant in Europe
Eastern Orthodox monarchs
1190s births
1245 deaths
13th-century monarchs in Asia
13th-century women rulers
Bagrationi dynasty of the Kingdom of Georgia
13th-century people from Georgia (country)
13th-century women from Georgia (country)
12th-century people from Georgia (country)
12th-century women from Georgia (country)